Joseph Bailey is an American psychologist, consultant and public speaker. He is noted largely for his 1990 book about addiction and treatment, The Serenity Principle and is the author of three other books on mental well-being: Slowing down to the Speed of Life (with best-selling author Richard Carlson), The Speed Trap: Avoiding the Frenzy of the Fast Lane, Slowing Down to the Speed of Love and Fearproof Your Life. Joe Bailey has been a psychotherapist for thirty-five years, and is a consultant to many corporations and healthcare, mental health and chemical dependency organizations. He is a seminar leader and trainer of professionals.
His practice of research and teaching an integration of psychological and spiritual health embraces many of his writing partner Richard Carlson's (Don't Sweat the Small Stuff) techniques in addressing a person's innate health, as well as those of Sydney Banks and refined by George Pransky and Roger C. Mills, known as "Health Realization."

Joe Bailey toured nationally to promote Slowing Down to the Speed of Life, The Speed Trap and Slowing Down to the Speed of Love. He has appeared on or been quoted in USA Today, The Chicago Tribune, The St. Paul Pioneer Press, Newsweek, Family Circle, Shape, Reader's Digest, Entrepreneur of the Year Magazine, Bay Area Parent, and The Oregonian. His television and radio interviews include CNBC Nightly News with Brian Williams, NBC Morning Show, New York City, Fox TV Morning Show, Boston, WCCO CBS special on Slowing Down to the Speed of Life, KMSP TV, KARE TV, WCCC radio KBEM Minneapolis, KMHL -MPLS.  KNUS-Denver, KBYR-Anchorage, WNYU-New York City, KURV-Texas, WMAQ-Chicago, KUIK0-Portland, OR. KPPT-Newport, OR. Talk America Network, WWRC-Washington D.C., Air America, and numerous other radio talk shows.  Bailey is a fly-fishing advocate and runs seminars with his partner George Patterson called "Fly Fishing for the Mind".

Bibliography 
J. Bailey, Fearproof Your Life: How to Thrive in a World Addicted to Fear, Conari Press 2007. , 
J.  Bailey, Slowing Down to the Speed of Love, McGraw-Hill, 2004. , 
J. Bailey, The Speed Trap: How to Avoid the Frenzy of the Fast Lane HarperOne 1999. , 
R. Carlson and J. Bailey, Slowing Down to the Speed of Life, HarperSanFrancisco 1998. , 
J. Bailey, The Serenity Principle: Finding Inner Peace in Recovery,  HarperSanFrancisco, 1990. ,

Articles 
 USA Today—Time Stackers, The Ultimate Juggling Act” September 1997
 Family Circle: “Stress Busting—Secrets from the Experts” September 15, 1998
 Newsweek, April 28, 1997: “Drowning in Data” Feeling Overwhelmed by Gadgets?
 Lansing Journal: “Slow Down, do more.” 1/15/98
 Natural Health Magazine: “Inspirations: Deep Listening” Nov/Dec 2003
 Namaste Magazine: “Is the Grass Really Greener on the Other Side of the Fence?” August/July 2001
 Minneapolis Star Tribune December 21, 1997: “Just Saying Yes to Simplicity”
 University of Minnesota, Pictures of Health Winter 2003 “Stop Look and Listen to your hearts: Recharging the Inner Lives of Healers”
 USA Today July 9, 1999, “Not going the Distance,Forget the frenzy. Some vacations are best savored in your own back yard”

References

External links 
 Official Site w/ Bio
 Minnesota Magazine "Is It Possible to Slow Down to the Speed of Life? 
 Learn fly fishing
 Fly Fishing for the Mind
 Fly Fishing Seminars, Dr. George Patterson, Joe Bailey

Year of birth missing (living people)
Living people
American motivational writers
21st-century American psychologists
American self-help writers